FortisBC is a Canadian owned, British Columbia based regulated utility focused on providing safe and reliable energy, including natural gas, Renewable Natural Gas, electricity and propane. FortisBC has approximately 2,600 employees serving more than 1.2 million customers in 135 B.C. communities and 58 First Nations communities across 150 Traditional Territories.

Two separate utilities do business as FortisBC – one focusing on the provision of electricity in the province's Southern Interior and the other on gas distribution throughout the province currently delivering natural gas, Renewable Natural Gas (RNG) and propane. 

The electricity utility (FortisBC Inc.) serves close to 185,000 customers both directly in communities such as Kelowna, Osoyoos, Trail, Castlegar, Princeton and Rossland and indirectly through the wholesale supply in the communities of Summerland, Penticton, Grand Forks, and Nelson. The company owns and operates approximately 7,300 kilometres of transmission and distribution power lines.

The gas utility (FortisBC Energy Inc.) serves more than 1,054,000 gas customers across British Columbia. FortisBC owns and operates approximately 50,500 kilometres of gas transmission and distribution pipelines. The company works with local farms, landfills, green energy companies and municipalities to capture and purify methane from organic waste, which would otherwise escape into the atmosphere as a greenhouse gas (GHG), to create Renewable Natural Gas, a carbon-neutral alternative to natural gas. 

FortisBC owns and operates two liquefied natural gas storage facilities and four regulated hydroelectric generating plants. FortisBC is indirectly, wholly owned by Fortis Inc., a leader in the North American regulated electric and gas utility industry. FortisBC Inc. and FortisBC Energy Inc. use the FortisBC name and logo under license from Fortis Inc.

The British Columbia Utilities Commission (BCUC) regulates both the gas and electricity utilities. Natural gas rates are reviewed every quarter and electricity rates are reviewed annually to ensure rates accurately reflect the cost of delivering energy and are fair to the customer.

Personnel
Roger Dall’Antonia is President and CEO for FortisBC. Vice presidents include: 
 Andrea Cadogan, People
 Michael Leclair, Major Projects and LNG
 Ian Lorimer, Finance and CFO
 Joe Mazza, Energy Supply and Resource Development
 Dawn Mehrer, Customer and Corporate Services
 Monic Pratch, General Counsel, Corporate Secretary and Sustainability
 Diane Roy, Regulatory Affairs
 Doyle Sam, Operations and Engineering
 Doug Slater, External and Indigenous Relations

History

FortisBC Inc. (electricity)
FortisBC Inc. is a subsidiary of Fortis Inc., a Canadian, investor-owned corporation. 

 1897: West Kootenay Power and Light Company Ltd. was incorporated by act of parliament
 1916: WKP was purchased by Cominco.
 1986: Teck Resources Ltd. acquires a significant stake in Cominco. The two companies would formally merge in 2001.
 September 1, 1988 – West Kootenay Power and Light Company, LTD became West Kootenay Power, Ltd.
 October 22, 2001: West Kootenay Power Ltd. was acquired by Utilicorp Networks Canada (British Columbia) Ltd.
 May 31, 2002: Utilicorp Networks Canada (British Columbia) Ltd. became Aquila Networks Canada (British Columbia) Ltd.
 September 2003: Fortis Inc. acquired Aquila’s Alberta and BC distribution and retail assets for $1.4 billion, including a large section of the Alberta transmission grid that Aquila had purchased from TransAlta for $600 million in 2000. 
 June 1, 2004 - Aquila Networks Canada (British Columbia) Ltd. became FortisBC Inc.

FortisBC Energy Inc. (natural gas)

FortisBC Energy Inc. is a subsidiary of Fortis Inc., a Canadian, investor-owned corporation.

 1952: Inland Natural Gas was incorporated to distribute natural gas throughout the interior of British Columbia. The company purchased St. John Oil and Gas, Peace River Transmission, Canadian Northern Oil and Gas, and Grand Prairie Transmission.
 1980s: Inland Natural Gas purchased the Lower Mainland gas division from BC Hydro and changed its name to BC Gas, serving 546,000 customers in 70 communities across BC.
 2002: BC Gas became the dominant distributor of natural gas in British Columbia by purchasing Centra Gas BC Inc. and Centra Gas Whistler Inc. adding 75,000 natural gas customers on the Sunshine Coast and Vancouver Island, and 2,000 piped propane customers in Whistler.
 2003: BC Gas Inc. became Terasen Inc.
 2005: Terasen Inc. was acquired by Kinder Morgan
 May 17, 2007: Fortis Inc. acquired Terasen Gas from Kinder Morgan
 2011: the Terasen group of companies – Terasen Gas Inc., Terasen Gas (Vancouver Island) Inc., Terasen Gas (Whistler) Inc. – become FortisBC Energy Inc.

Facilities and assets

FortisBC owns four hydroelectric generating plants on the Kootenay River with a total capacity of 225 megawatts (MW). They are the Corra Linn, Upper Bonnington, Lower Bonnington and South Slocan plants.

Corra Linn

The Corra Linn Dam was built in 1932 to control upstream storage by raising Kootenay Lake and generating power through three 19,000 horsepower units operating under the depth of water behind the dam of approximately 16 metres. The aggregate generating capacity is 51 MW.

Upper Bonnington

The Upper Bonnington Generating Plant consists of six hydroelectric units in two adjacent powerhouses, a 15-metre-high concrete gravity dam, a powerhouse with two sections, a gated spillway and an overflow spillway. The original powerhouse was built in 1907, upgraded in 1916 and extended again in 1939 for a total rated capacity of 65 MW. Also at the same Bonnington Falls location, but on the other side of the river is the City of Nelson Powerhouse in operation since 1907. In 2018, the publication Hydro Review inducted the plant into their Hydro Hall of Fame, a program that recognizes extraordinary hydro power achievement throughout the world, with a special emphasis on long-lasting facilities.

Lower Bonnington

The Lower Bonnington Dam is composed of a powerhouse behind an intake dam on the right bank of the Kootenay River and a concrete gravity structure approximately 18 metres high. The original dam built in 1897 consisted of a rock-filled timber crib dam that straddled the river upstream of the falls at this site. In 1924, the dam was demolished and replaced with a new, larger plant that included three units that increased aggregate generating capacity to 54 MW. It was then reconstructed in 1964. The Lower Bonnington Dam is located on the Kootenay River approximately 18 km southwest of Nelson, BC.

South Slocan

The South Slocan Dam was commissioned in 1928 and has an aggregate generating capacity of 54 MW. The South Slocan Dam is located on the Kootenay River, near South Slocan, 20 km southwest of Nelson on British Columbia Highway 3A.

Generation plant operations
FortisBC also operates and maintains five generating plants owned by others, with a total generating capacity of 1,322 MW:

 Waneta Expansion Project, which is owned by Columbia Power Corporation and Columbia Basin Trust
 Waneta Dam, which is owned by Teck and BC Hydro]
 Arrow Lakes Generating Station, which is owned by Columbia Power Corporation
 Brilliant Dam and Brilliant Expansion, which are owned by Columbia Power Corporation and Columbia Basin Trust

Liquefied Natural Gas (LNG) Production and Sales
FortisBC is the owner and operator of two LNG facilities in British Columbia.

Tilbury LNG plant

FortisBC’s Tilbury LNG facility was Canada’s first LNG facility and has provided safe, reliable LNG since 1971. Built originally to solely ensure energy supply during high winter demand, Tilbury now also provides LNG for the marine transportation industry and small-scale exports via ISO containers. As the demand for LNG as a marine fuel grows, the company is also working with the Vancouver Fraser Port Authority to develop the first ship-to-ship LNG marine refuelling service on the west coast of North America. This facility holds up to 74,000 cubic metres of LNG and is also the first in Canada to produce LNG for export overseas.

The Tilbury LNG facility is powered by renewable hydroelectricity providing local and global customers with LNG. A lifecycle greenhouse gas emissions (GHG) analysis from environmental consultant, Sphera, found the Tilbury facility produces LNG with nearly 30 per cent less carbon intensity than the global LNG supply, on average. 

FortisBC is also planning to expand its Tilbury facility to meet increasing demand for LNG into the future. The proposed Tilbury Phase 2 LNG Expansion Project would improve the resiliency of the gas system – ensuring it has the natural gas supply to support its customers’ needs in times of high demand. It would also help the company advance LNG as a marine fuel or meet demand from overseas customers. The proposed project includes the construction of a new storage tank that can hold up to 162,000 cubic metres of LNG, potentially tripling Tilbury’s current storage capacity and a new liquefaction unit with a capacity of 3.5 million tonnes per year to produce LNG for domestic use, marine fuelling or overseas export.

Mt. Hayes facility

The 20-hectare Mt. Hayes facility is located approximately six kilometres northwest of Ladysmith. The storage facility, supplied by FortisBC’s existing pipeline systems, has about a 70,000m3 capacity to store liquefied natural gas. Since 2011, this facility has helped keep natural gas costs lower even when demand is high. This project is a joint venture with the Stz'uminus First Nation.

Energy offerings
FortisBC Energy Inc. is the largest distributor of natural gas, Renewable Natural Gas and piped propane in British Columbia, serving more than 1,054,000 natural gas customers in the Lower Mainland, Vancouver Island, the Sunshine Coast, Whistler and the Interior of the province. The company also delivers natural gas and Renewable Natural Gas to northern communities such as Prince George and Fort Nelson, B.C. It delivers piped propane to customers in Revelstoke, BC. 

It operates approximately 50,500 km of natural gas transmission and distribution pipelines, 11 compressor stations and two LNG facilities, one in Delta, B.C. and the other on Vancouver Island. The distribution network also includes several underwater pipeline crossings, including under the Columbia and Fraser rivers and the Strait of Georgia.

The Whistler natural gas line was built in conjunction with the Sea to Sky Highway Improvement Project, which was completed for the Vancouver-Whistler 2010 Winter Olympic Games. The natural gas line falls mainly within the highway right of way and brings natural gas to the Resort Municipality of Whistler, which was formerly served by propane.

Electricity
FortisBC, and its predecessor companies, have operated and maintained hydroelectric power facilities in British Columbia since 1897. FortisBC owns four hydroelectric generating plants on the Kootenay River with a total capacity of 225 megawatts (MW). They are the Corra Linn, Upper Bonnington, Lower Bonnington and South Slocan plants. Combined, these plants provide about 45 per cent of the annual electricity needs of FortisBC electricity customers. They also operate and maintain additional facilities under management agreements in both regulated and non-regulated environments. These facilities include Waneta Dam, Arrow Lakes Generating Station and Brilliant Dam.

Electric vehicle infrastructure
As an electricity provider, FortisBC continues to expand the electric vehicle (EV) charging network in the South Okanagan and Kootenay regions. In 2021, it opened 10 new stations, giving EV drivers access to highway-grade charging infrastructure and supporting the growing demand. At the end of 2021, FortisBC had a total of 40 EV charging stations across 22 sites.

Renewable Natural Gas
When bacteria break down organic waste from sources such as landfill sites, agricultural waste and wastewater from treatment facilities, it produces a biogas mostly made of methane. FortisBC works with local farms, landfills, green energy companies and municipalities to capture and purify this methane, which would otherwise escape into the atmosphere as a greenhouse gas, to create RNG. Therefore, RNG does not contribute any net carbon dioxide into the atmosphere. It also mixes seamlessly into existing natural gas infrastructure, displacing conventional natural gas and lowering GHG emissions as a result. RNG is injected into FortisBC’s existing system and delivered to its customers, just like conventional natural gas.

In June 2011, FortisBC launched the RNG program for customers in the Lower Mainland, Fraser Valley, Interior and the Kootenays. FortisBC residential, commercial and industrial customers can opt into the program and designate a fixed percent, up to a 100 per cent, of their natural gas usage be RNG. FortisBC acquires equivalent amounts of RNG to cover customer demand for its distribution system from RNG suppliers. 

In 2021, FortisBC had signed a total of 30 supply agreements to purchase RNG in BC and out of province.  Suppliers include: 
 Dicklands Farms in Chilliwack BC
 Fraser Valley Biogas in Abbotsford
 Glenmore Landfill in Kelowna
 Salmon Arm Landfill
 Seabreeze Dairy Farm in Delta
 Surrey Biofuel Facility 
 Lulu Island Wastewater Treatment Plant in Richmond

There are a number of projects in development or in construction including:  
 The RNG production facilities are under construction at the City of Vancouver’s landfill in Delta BC.
 The RNG production facilities (from wood waste) are under construction at REN Energy International Corp. in Fruitvale BC.
 An RNG project is under development at the Regional District of Fraser-Fort George – Foothills Boulevard Regional Landfill in Prince George BC.

The BCUC also approved in 2020 FortisBC’s request to purchase RNG from suppliers outside of BC. The company has signed agreements with RNG suppliers in Alberta and Ontario and the United States.

Compressed natural gas
BC’s transportation industry is responsible for the largest share of provincial GHG emissions at 41 per cent, and fuelling with natural gas is one way to reduce emissions in this sector. Fuelling medium and heavy-duty vehicles with compressed natural gas (CNG) can reduce GHG emissions by up to 30 per cent compared to diesel and gasoline.

BC Transit and Translink both use of CNG in their bus fleets and Translink is taking an addition step to transition their bus fleets to use compressed RNG. In addition, organizations including UPS Canada, Yen Brothers, McRaes Environmental, London Drugs and ColdStar Solutions Inc. use CNG to power some of their fleet vehicles. 

At the end of 2021, FortisBC had provided incentives to fleet operators for more than 1,000 medium and heavy-duty vehicles so they can operate on natural gas.

Liquefied natural gas in the marine sector 
FortisBC’s Tilbury LNG facility has positioned the company to provide LNG to marine vessels like ferries in an effort to help lower GHG emissions in the marine industry. Conventional marine fuels contribute to smog and poor local air quality with air contaminants. By using LNG from FortisBC’s facilities, GHG emissions could be reduced by up to 27 per cent. In addition, particulate matter could be reduced by up to 99 per cent, nitrogen oxides by up to 95 per cent and sulphur oxides could be reduced by almost 100 per cent compared to the same conventional marine fuels.

FortisBC has provided LNG for organizations such as BC Ferries and Seaspan Ferries for years to help significantly reduce GHG emissions and lowering fuel costs. Given the advantages of LNG compared to conventional marine fuel, there is an opportunity to create a global LNG fuelling hub in the Port of Vancouver. The practice of fuelling a marine vessel is known as bunkering and FortisBC created an innovative method of bunkering LNG that uses customized tanker trucks fuelling right on board a vessel. The company developed this proprietary design by collaborating with BC Ferries, Seaspan Ferries and their shipbuilders.

Propane
FortisBC delivers piped propane to around 1,500 residential and commercial customers in Revelstoke, BC. The piped propane system was first introduced to Revelstoke in 1991 because the city was located too great of a distance from the natural gas distribution system. Currently, propane is supplied to Revelstoke by railcars and tanker trucks, where it is offloaded into storage tanks, vaporized as needed, and distributed to customers through an underground piped distribution system.

Energy efficiency and conservation programs
FortisBC is mandated to provide conservation and energy efficiency programs to customers, helping them lower energy use and reduce GHG emissions. In April 2009, FortisBC implemented a $41.5 million energy efficiency and conservation program after receiving approval from the BCUC to use those funds from 2009 to 2010. In November 2009, the BCUC approved an extension of the program until the end of 2011, and increased allowed expenditures by approximately $38.5 million. FortisBC continues to provide millions in funding and incentives every year to help British Columbians use less energy and save money. 

Customers upgrading to high-efficiency residential appliances and equipment such as furnaces, water heaters and fireplaces can receive a rebate to reduce the cost of choosing high-efficiency models. There are similar programs and offers available to commercial and industrial customers to encourage the transition to higher efficiency equipment. In addition, additional funding is provided for energy efficiency education to help encourage customer behaviour changes to reduce energy consumption. 

In 2019, the BCUC approved FortisBC’s request to expand its overall energy-efficiency investment to $368.5 million over the 2019–2022 period. The request formed part of FortisBC’s 2019-2022 Demand Side Management Applications for both its natural gas and electricity operations. This represents the largest funding approval FortisBC has received to date for its energy efficiency initiatives. 

In 2021, FortisBC invested close to $120 million in these conservation and energy efficiency programs, helping more British Columbians upgrade to high-efficiency natural gas and electricity equipment. Improving energy efficiency in homes and businesses can help customers reduce monthly bills and lower GHG emissions. Improving energy efficiency coupled with opting into FortisBC’s RNG program will help customers further decarbonize their homes and businesses.

See also
 List of dams in the Columbia River watershed
 Columbia Power Corporation
 List of power stations in British Columbia
 Princeton Light & Power

References

External links

Virtual museum - Dams Of The Columbia Basin

Electric power companies of Canada
Hydroelectric power companies of Canada
Companies based in Kelowna
Companies based in Surrey, British Columbia
Kootenays
Fortis Inc.